Martha Ruech is an Austrian luger who competed during the early 1970s. A natural track luger, she won the bronze medal in the women's singles event at the 1973 FIL European Luge Natural Track Championships in Taisten, Italy.

References
Natural track European Championships results 1970-2006.

Austrian female lugers
Possibly living people
Year of birth missing
20th-century Austrian women